San Nazzaro railway station is a railway station in the municipality of Gambarogno, in the Swiss canton of Ticino. It is an intermediate stop on the standard gauge Cadenazzo–Luino line of Swiss Federal Railways.

Services 
 the following services stop at San Nazzaro:

References

External links 
 
 

Railway stations in Ticino
Swiss Federal Railways stations